The Nahma and Northern Railway Locomotive #5 is a locomotive located at the corner of Main Street and River Street in Nahma Township, Michigan.

History
The town of Nahma was established in 1881 by the Bay De Noquet Lumber Company as the base for its upper Michigan lumbering operations.  The company began harvesting softwoods, but as the supply decreased, it was forced to turn to hardwood logging. In 1901, the Bay De Noquet Lumber Company began construction of a railroad system, the Nahma and Northern, leading from Nahma into the surrounding forest and various lumber camps. The railway eventually had 75 miles of track,  The Nahma and Northern had seven locomotives, one caboose, and over 100 Russell Cars for hauling timber.

The railroad was abandoned in 1948. In 1951, the town of Nahma was sold to the American Playground Device Co. for development into a resort.  The planned resort, however, never got off the ground.

Description
This locomotive is a 2-6-2 coal-burning locomotive, built by the Baldwin Company of Philadelphia in 1912.

References

External links
 Nahma and Northern Railroad from Michigan Railroads

2-6-2 locomotives
Baldwin locomotives
National Register of Historic Places in Michigan
Railway locomotives introduced in 1912
Tourist attractions in Delta County, Michigan
National Register of Historic Places in Delta County, Michigan
Preserved steam locomotives of Michigan